Hospital Severo Ochoa is a station on Line 12 of the Madrid Metro. It is located in fare Zone B1.

References 

Line 12 (Madrid Metro) stations
Buildings and structures in Leganés
Railway stations in Spain opened in 2003